Hawick Community Hospital is a health facility at Victoria Road in Hawick, Scotland. It is managed by NHS Borders.

History
The hospital was commissioned to replace the ageing Hawick Cottage Hospital. It was built by Border Construction on the site of a former Pringle of Scotland factory at a cost of £4.5 million and opened in 2005.

References

Hospitals in the Scottish Borders
2005 establishments in Scotland
Hospitals established in 2005
Hospital buildings completed in 2005
NHS Scotland hospitals
NHS Borders